Svitlana Kopchykova (born 17 March 1967) is a Ukrainian swimmer. She competed in three events at the 1988 Summer Olympics representing the Soviet Union.

References

External links
 

1967 births
Living people
Ukrainian female swimmers
Olympic swimmers of the Soviet Union
Swimmers at the 1988 Summer Olympics
Universiade medalists in swimming
Sportspeople from Cherkasy
Universiade gold medalists for the Soviet Union
Soviet female swimmers